Chan Poh Lin (9 July 1943 – 6 June 2016), better known as Theresa Poh Lin Chan, was a Singaporean writer and teacher. Born in Singapore, she was known in her youth as "the Helen Keller of Southeast Asia", as, like Keller, Chan was a highly accomplished deaf and blind person. Chan was the subject of a BBC radio documentary and inspired a Singaporean film.

Chan has been deaf since age 12, and deafblind since age 14.

John Wilson, director of the Royal Commonwealth Society for the Blind, met Chan when he visited Singapore in 1958, and recalled in his 1963 book, Travelling Blind: “She told me she wanted to learn like Helen Keller, to speak English like the Queen of England, to meet everyone in the world.” On his recommendation, Poh was accepted at the Perkins School for the Blind in Massachusetts where she topped the school in Mathematics, became president of the sports club, and learned to dance, ice skate, knit, and horseback ride. In 1961, she fulfilled her dream of meeting Helen Keller in Connecticut.

Chan spent 13 years in the United States and returned to Singapore in 1973 to take care of her aging parents. She became a teacher at the Singapore School for the Blind, but eventually lost the job in 1990.

Chan was the subject of a 1964 BBC radio documentary, "Child of the Silent Night: The story of Chan Poh Lin" by Stephen Grenfell. She also starred in the feature film, Be with Me (2005), a Singaporean movie in three parts, which was inspired by her life. Chan is credited as a writer for the film as well, considered because her writings about her life were part of the inspiration for the film.

Chan died in June 2016, a month before her 73rd birthday. In 2017, she was inducted into the Singapore Women's Hall of Fame.

Notes

Further reading
Morgenstern, Joseph. "Chan Poh Lin, The Chinese Girl Of Eighteen, Who Can Neither See Nor Hear", World Health magazine, March–April 1962, pp. 29–31.

External links

1943 births
2016 deaths
Singaporean deafblind people
Deaf actresses
Year of birth uncertain
Singaporean Roman Catholics